Ihor Samiylovych Bondarenko (born 20 November 1964) is a Ukrainian entrepreneur and politician. He is the former Governor of Zakarpattia Oblast.

Biography 
In 1986, he graduated from Simferopol Higher Military-Political Construction School. He also graduated from the National Academy of State Administration (2005) and the National Academy of Internal Affairs (2012). PhD in Public Administration (2010).

Bondarenko served as Deputy Chairman of the Mukachevo Raion State Administration.

He worked as an assistant consultant to the People's Deputy of Ukraine Mykola Onishchuk.

In the 2007 Ukrainian parliamentary election, he unsuccessfully ran for the Verkhovna Rada (Ukraine's parliament) for Election Bloc Liudmyla Suprun – Ukrainian Regional Asset.

From 2008 to 2010, Bondarenko headed the Administrative Department of the Ministry of Justice.

References

External links 
 
 

1964 births
Living people
21st-century Ukrainian politicians
21st-century Ukrainian businesspeople
People from Saky Raion
People from Mukachevo
National Academy of State Administration alumni
Governors of Zakarpattia Oblast
People's Democratic Party (Ukraine) politicians
Independent politicians in Ukraine